Merton Leland Miller is a former professor of the University of Chicago who also served as the acting chief of the Ethnological Survey for the Philippine Islands. He is the one who discovered and studied the burial jars found on the island of Camiguin in 1910.

Education
Graduated from Colby College in 1890 and earned a PhD from the University of Chicago in 1897.

Career
Acting Chief of The Ethnological Survey for the Philippine Islands.  President of the Mindanao Estates Co., a hemp farm organized in Manila, Philippines, in 1904.  Involved in tax litigation in 1942 regarding dividends received from the Balatoc Mining Company (now Benguet Corporation).

Published works
The Non-Christian people of Ambos Camarines, Merton L. Miller, Bureau of Printing, 1911
The burial mounds of Camiguin Island, Merton L. Miller, Bureau of Printing, 1911
The Mangyans of Mindoro, Merton L. Miller, Bureau of Printing, 1912

References

Colby College alumni
University of Chicago alumni
1953 deaths
1870 births